Life and Death Row is a BBC documentary television series telling the story of capital punishment through the eyes of young people whose lives have been shaped by it.

Series 1
Episode 1, Execution, aired on 17 March 2014 on BBC Three, looks at two of the youngest men on death row in Texas.

Episode 2, Judgement, follows the trial of the Glynn County mass murder where Guy Heinze, Jr. was accused of murdering his entire family of eight in their trailer park home in Georgia.

Episode 3, Crisis Stage, the last of Series 1, follows a law student fighting for the lives of two of the youngest killers facing execution.

Series 2
The BBC aired the second series of Life and Death Row on BBC Three starting on 15 February 2016, the final day before the BBC moved the channel to an online format only.

Episode 1, titled Execution as was in Series 1, centres on death row inmate Daniel Lee Lopez, who was convicted of murdering a Corpus Christi city police officer by hitting him with his SUV as he was trying to evade capture following a routine traffic stop. The programme follows, Lopez, his family and city officials in the weeks and months leading up to and after his execution.

Episode 2, titled Punishment, follows the trial of Shawn Ford Jr. who was accused of the murder of Jeff and Margaret Schobert in New Franklin, Ohio. The jury must decide whether Ford should live or die.

Episode 3, Truth, recounts the stories of two 19-year-old friends, Austin Myers and Timothy Moseley, charged with the murder of Justin Back, an 18-year-old Waynesville High School graduate who was murdered in his own home. Myers and Moseley both gave different stories to the authorities. The programme follows the police investigation to establish what actually happened.

Episode 4, Forgiveness is the final episode of Series 2 and follows 23 year-old TT Trottie on his journey as he prepares to lose another parent after his father, Willie Tyrone Trottie, was convicted and sentenced to death for the murder of TT's mother Barbara Canada and her brother, Titus, in Houston in May 1993, when TT was just 18 months old.

Series 3
Love Triangle consisted of eight shorts recounting the police investigation, trial and sentencing of the murder of Heather Strong. These episodes last for approximately 10 minutes each in contrast to the hour long episodes of series 1 and 2.

The Mass Execution consists of four 60 or 75 minute episodes looking at the eight inmates on Arkansas death row whose executions were pushed forward due to the expiration date on the Midazolam used in these executions.

External links
 Life and Death Row (BBC Three)

2014 British television series debuts
2018 British television series endings
2010s British documentary television series
Capital punishment in the United States
English-language television shows
Television shows set in the United States